Gerald Dunn may refer to:
 Ged Dunn, English rugby union and rugby league player
 Gerald R. Dunn, Michigan politician